Ödemarkens son ("Son of the Wilderness") is the second full-length album by Swedish progressive/folk metal band Vintersorg. It was released on 16 November 1999. It builds on the folk metal of the previous album.

Track listing

Personnel
 Vintersorg - vocals, guitars, bass, acoustic guitars & keyboard on track 8

Additional personnel
 Vargher - keyboards
 Andreas Frank - lead guitar on tracks 1, 5, 8 & 9
 Cia Hedmark - vocals on tracks 2 & 4, violin

Vintersorg albums
1999 albums
Napalm Records albums